María Rita Calvo Sanz O.D.N is a Spanish Roman Catholic nun, one of the seven first women appointed members of the Congregation for Institutes of Consecrated Life and Societies of Apostolic Life the second highest-ranking department of the Roman Curia, the administrative institution of the Holy See since 8 July 2019, when was appointed by Pope Francis.

On 27 July 2015 she was named Superior General of Sisters of the Company of Mary, Our Lady.

References 

Living people
Officials of the Roman Curia
Women officials of the Roman Curia
Superiors general
Sisters of the Company of Mary, Our Lady
Members of the Congregation for Institutes of Consecrated Life and Societies of Apostolic Life
Year of birth missing (living people)
21st-century Spanish nuns